Miguel Ángel Prieto Adanero (born 20 September 1964) is a race walker from Spain, who represented his native country at the 1992 Olympic Games in Barcelona, Spain, where he came tenth overall. He was a four-time Spanish indoor champion in the 5000 m walk and won the outdoor 20 km national title in 1990.

Prieto was born in Segovia, and made his international debut at the 1983 European Athletics Junior Championships, placing fifth in the 10,000 m walk. He came seventh in the 20 km race walk at the 1985 IAAF World Race Walking Cup then went on to win a bronze medal in the event at the 1986 European Athletics Championships. He established himself as one of Spain's leading walkers, competing at the World Championships in Athletics in 1987 and 1991. Prieto won his second international medal at the 1989 Summer Universiade, where he was the silver medallist in the 20 km walk behind Italy's Walter Arena. He came 13th at the 1990 European Athletics Championships and finished one place lower than that at the 1991 IAAF World Race Walking Cup.

He made a competitive return at the age of 46 at the 2011 European Race Walking Cup. He managed 14th place in the 50 km event.

International competitions

References

1964 births
Living people
People from Segovia
Sportspeople from the Province of Segovia
Spanish male racewalkers
Olympic athletes of Spain
Athletes (track and field) at the 1992 Summer Olympics
World Athletics Championships athletes for Spain
European Athletics Championships medalists
Universiade medalists in athletics (track and field)
Universiade silver medalists for Spain
Medalists at the 1989 Summer Universiade